Boomi is a software company that specializes in integration platform as a service (iPaaS), API management, master data management and data preparation. Boomi was founded in Berwyn, Pennsylvania, and first launched its services in 2007.

History
Boomi was founded in 2000, beginning with "configuration-based" integration. Its technology allows users to build and deploy integration processes using a visual interface and a drag and drop technique. This interface remains one of the key elements of the current Boomi platform. The company was named after Bhūmi, the Hindu goddess representing Mother Earth.

In 2007, Boomi released the technology now known as "AtomSphere," an Integration Cloud. AtomSphere kept the visual, point and click interface for building integrations and can be managed through a browser-based UI.

On November 2, 2010, Boomi announced its acquisition by Dell.

In March 2017, Boomi acquired cloud-development platform company ManyWho.

In December 2019, Boomi acquired Unifi Software.

In February 2020, Boomi released its Integration Center of Excellence (ICoE) service.

As of March 2020, Boomi has approximately 1,300 employees and 11,000 customers.

On May 2, 2021, it was announced that Francisco Partners and TPG Capital had entered into a definitive agreement with Dell Technologies to acquire Boomi.

Platform 
Boomi provides an integration platform as a service (iPaaS), which enables the connection of applications and data sources. It is a low-code development platform. The platform provides API, lifecycle management and event-driven architecture features for cloud integration. This includes an API Proxy, API Gateway and API Developer Portal.

The platform also supports event-driven architectures. Boomi's EDA partners include Dell EMC and Solace as well as vendors specializing in message brokers, event meshes, streaming and pub/sub technology. The platform also offers integrations for Amazon SQS, Microsoft's Azure Service Bus services and Pivotal's RabbitMQ.

After Boomi acquired Unifi Software, Boomi incorporated data discovery, catalog and preparation tools into its platform, and continues to offer Unifi as a stand-alone product.

In August 2019, Boomi’s iPaaS was authorized by FedRAMP.

Boomi's platform is currently being used by the American Cancer Society, Bank of America Merrill Lynch, Gilead Sciences, International Justice Mission, Novartis, Sky Group, University of Technology Sydney and Moderna.

The ICoE service run by Boomi provides reusable frameworks and industry guidelines for integration.

References

External links
 Boomi homepage

2000 establishments in Pennsylvania
Cloud computing providers
Companies based in Chester County, Pennsylvania
Companies acquired by Dell
American companies established in 2000
Software companies established in 2000
Software companies based in Pennsylvania
Software companies of the United States
2010 mergers and acquisitions
2021 mergers and acquisitions
TPG Capital companies
Private equity portfolio companies